Orchard Beach State Park is a public recreation area covering  on the shore of Lake Michigan in Manistee Township,  Manistee County, Michigan. Situated on a bluff three miles north of the city of Manistee, the  state park offers, camping, hiking trails, and scenic views over Lake Michigan. The beach has been closed due to high lake levels.

History
The park was developed by the Manistee, Filer City and Eastlake Railway Company and opened in 1892. After the company stopped trolley service to the park, the site was purchased by the Manistee Board of Commerce and deeded to the state to become part of the Michigan state park system in 1921.

The Civilian Conservation Corps was active in the park in the 1930s. Corps efforts included construction of several limestone structures including a pavilion, toilet, line house, and pump house. In 2009, the park was listed on the U.S. National Register of Historic Places, being cited as "one of the most intact examples of a Michigan state park developed in the 1930s and 1940s under National Park Service guidelines.... retain[ing] the majority of its CCC-era buildings and physical layout." In 2019, the high levels of Lake Michigan were eroding the sandy bluff on which the CCC-built pavilion stands.

In the news
In 2019, it was reported that erosion caused by record high water levels on Lake Michigan threatened the park's historic pavilion with destruction. The pavilion stands  from the edge of the bluff. High water had covered the sandy beach at the base of the bluff, below the pavilion, since 2017, and the stairway built to access the beach from the pavilion led straight into the high waters of Lake Michigan. The pavilion was moved away from the shore in December 2020.

Activities and amenities
The park offers swimming, fishing, three miles of hiking trails, picnicking facilities, and a 166-site campground.

References

External links

Orchard Beach State Park Michigan Department of Natural Resources
Orchard Beach State Park Map Michigan Department of Natural Resources

State parks of Michigan
Beaches of Michigan
Protected areas of Manistee County, Michigan
Protected areas established in 1921
Parks on the National Register of Historic Places in Michigan
Landforms of Manistee County, Michigan
National Register of Historic Places in Manistee County, Michigan
1921 establishments in Michigan
IUCN Category III